This is a list of characters from the Japanese tokusatsu series .

BOARD
In Super Hero Taisen GP, they along with the Tachibana Racing Club become the sponsors for the former Kamen Rider 3, Kyoichiro Kuroi.

Kazuma Kenzaki
 was chosen by the BOARD organization to use the sealed Category Ace of Spades (Change Beetle) to become Kamen Rider Blade. He has a good heart and believes in fighting to protect humanity. He would ultimately sacrifice his own human existence by mutating into the second Joker after excessive use of his Rider form's King Form transformation. This forces a stalemate in the Battle Fight while there is more than one Undead, keeping mankind safe while allowing his friend Hajime, the original Joker, to continue living among humans. Kazuma makes return appearances in Kamen Rider Decade and Kamen Rider Zi-O; the latter of which saw his humanity restored.

As the user of Rider System-02, developed by BOARD to enable a human to augment themselves with Undead DNA via the Rouse Cards, Kazuma uses the  belt in conjunction with the Change Beetle Rouse Card to become Blade. In his default form, Blade uses the  sword as both a weapon and a storage unit for Rouse Cards, including Proper Blanks. The Blay Rouzer's built-in 'rouzing' technology allows Blade to use an Undead's power in his attacks, using a combination of cards to perform a finisher.

Using the Absorb Capricorn as a catalyst, Kazuma uses the Fusion Eagle card to assume  with flight capabilities and the Blay Rouzer enhanced. After acquiring the Evolution Caucasus card, Kazuma gains the ability to assume  with the  broadsword. While assumed to only absorb the DNA of the Caucasus Undead, Kazuma's Fusion Ratio was potent enough to assimilate his entire deck. With extended activity in this form, the subject's fusion coefficiency would raise exponentially, ultimately mutating the human being into a Joker-type Undead. To that end, use on Kazuma's part, was strictly cautioned and advised only as a last resort.

Sakuya Tachibana
 was originally a researcher of BOARD's Humanity Foundation who graduated from the Sazahaibu University and was selected to be the user of Rider System 01, using the sealed Category Ace of Diamond (Change Stag) to become . From the beginning of the series, Sakuya begins to suffer a form of cellular breakdown, and only by sealing the Undead did the process slow down. Sakuya blames Karasuma for his condition, and the fact that Kazuma was appointed as his backup rider in case he could not cope on his own did not improve his relationship with Karasuma. When he attempted to seal the Locust Undead before it attacked BOARD, Sakuya is forced to abduct Karasuma for answers prior to him going into a coma. However, it is only revealed later that the "Karasuma" he safeguarded was only a decoy as Sakuya learns that it is actually his subconscious fear that is causing the breakdown.

Sakuya encounters Isaka, the Peacock Undead, who recruits him by removing his fears with exposure to Schuld Kestner seaweed, an extinct plant that intensifies the aggressive nature of the subject. Though he became more aggressive and worked under Isaka for more of the seaweed, Sakuya was unaware of the eventual damage it would do to his nervous system. Though his dear friend Sayoko Fukasawa tries to warn him, Sakuya does not listen until he learns that Isaka murdered Sayoko for meddling in his affairs. Sakuya overcomes his fear while defeating the Peacock Undead and sealing him.

Later in the series, as restitution for being manipulated by an Undead, Sakuya takes Mutsuki under his wing, attempting to help him stay in control of the Spider Undead. During the final few episodes, Kamen Rider Garren came face to face with the Giraffa Undead and battled it out with him. Despite the Undead warning him the consequences of Hajime being the last Undead standing, thus making him champion of the Battle Fight, Garren insists on believing in his friend before the two fall off a cliff. The battle ended with Garren nowhere to be found and the King Undead sealed leaving the Joker as the winner. He is found upon the arrival of the Chief telling Kazuma that he was saved because of him.

As the user of Rider System-01, the prototype of the Rider Sistem-02, Sakuya uses the  belt in conjunction with the Change Stag Rouse Card to become Garren. In his default form, Garren uses the  firearm as both a weapon and a storage unit for Rouse Cards, including Proper Blanks. The Garren Rouzer's built-in 'rouzing' technology allows Garren to use an Undead's power in his attacks, using a combination of cards to perform a finisher. Sakuya later receives his own Rouze Absorber from Kei Karasuma to bolster his capabilities by harnessing the Royal Club Undead. Using the Absorb Serpent card as a catalyst, Kazuma uses the Fusion Peacock card to assume  with flight ability and the Garren Rouzer enhanced

Shiori Hirose
 is a 20-year-old lady who is one of the few remaining BOARD members after it was attacked by the released Undead, helping the Riders by detecting the Undead on her Undead-searching computer. She seems to care for Kazuma very much.

Kei Karasuma
 is the President of BOARD. A 48-year-old professor who created the Rider systems 01 and 02 (Garren and Blade), as well as the Leangle System (03), while he was under control of Isaka. During his travels, he befriends Noboru Shima, whom he entrusted the Rouze Absorbers to despite knowing he was an Undead. He is also aware of the side effect of Kazuma's King Form as well as Tennoji's plans of the fake Battle Fight.

4 years in non-canonical movie after the series end he and Sakuya tried to cover 52 cards, when Albino Joker appeared and unsealed Undeads, who attacked and killed Karasuma.

Yoshito Hirose
 is Shiori's father, the one responsible for breaking the Undead's seal in a fit of madness, dying in the process. He created the Trial-series Undead  in his image to protect Shiori, possessing all his creator's memories. However, Trial B was reprogrammed by Tennōji to continue to monitor the fixed Undead battle and remove potential threats before he sacrifices to protect Shiori from Trial G.

Hiroshi Tennoji
 is a rogue chairman of BOARD who intentionally set up the series of events in the fake Battle Fight and the creation of the Category Ace Kerberos, so that he could have his warped dream of a new world order with himself as its ruler. In the end, he was murdered by the Giraffa Undead after he was defeated by the Riders with his dreams shattered.

Recurring characters

Hajime Aikawa
Unsealed around the time the other Undead were released, Joker sealed the Mantis Undead into the Category Ace of Hearts (Change Mantis) to become the wild card . Joker later seals the previous Battle Fight winner known as Human Undead, who willingly surrendered to provide him human form to hide his presence. But Royal Club Undead like the Griffa Undead knew of this and attempted to seal him, with a photographer named Kurihara mortally wounded by accident in the skirmish. The dying photographer handed him a photograph of his family and Joker decided to protect his family in order to atone for his death, assuming the identity of freelance photographer Hajime Aikawa. Though he thought less of humans originally, Hajime's time at the Jacaranda Cafe with Kurihara's daughter Amane's helped him accept humanity to the point of wished he was truly human.

Though he and Kazuma disliked each other earlier, Hajime's growing humanity eventually warms up to Kazuma, who became a dear friend of his, then Garren and later to a limited extent, Mutsuki as well. However, when the Caucasus Undead takes most of his cards, the sealed Mantis Undead among them, it causes Hajime to regress back into the Joker after attempting to resist until Leangle unseals Hajime's cards and uses the Undead against him. Even after managing to reseal them all, the Joker aspect regained control and goes on a rampage until he is provided with the Evolution Paradoxa, allowing Hajime to regain full control of himself. This lasted until the Giriffa Undead was sealed, leaving the Joker the final victor of the Battle Fight. Hajime loses control once more and his impulse as Joker comes forth with the Stone of Sealing creating his army of DarkRoaches to eliminate all life. In the end, Kazuma is the only one to fight him head on, with Hajime pleading Kazuma to defeat and seal him.

The series ends with Hajime being allowed to live as a human thanks to Kazuma sacrificing his humanity and becoming another Joker to force the Battle Fight into a stalemate. Though the events of Kamen Rider Zi-O forced the two into a rematch that nearly destroyed the world, the fight ended with Hajime becoming completely human and allowed to live with Amane.

The events of Missing Ace, set in an alternate continuity, sees Hajime sealed by Blade during their final battle before was unsealed four years later by Leangle due to the Albino Joker. In the end, Hajime sacrificed himself by switching places with Amane to save her and give the other Riders an advantage over their enemy. His spirit was later shown watching over Amane, the girl assured by Kazuma that Hajime will always be there.

Kotaro Shirai
 is a 23-year-old aspiring writer, helping Kazuma and Shiori's mission by giving them hospitality. He loves to drink milk.

Mutsuki Kamijo
 is a weak-willed 17-year-old high-school kid was chosen by the improperly sealed Category Ace of Clubs (Change Spider/Spider Undead) to use the Rider System 03 and become , though reluctantly at first. He gains a thirst for power as the Spider Undead takes over his mind, using him to attack the other Riders. But, later he is redeemed thanks to the sealed Tiger and Tarantula Undead giving Mutsuki the strength to force the Spider Undead out and the chance to fight on his own power, eventually allowing him to seal the Spider Undead properly and using the Rider System without any adverse effects, while psychologically properly completes him as a man capable of being a rider. Soon after, Mutsuki becomes a valuable ally to the other Kamen Riders. He is also the only Kamen Rider in the show that is based on an arachnid.

As the user of Rider System-03, developed by Isaka reverse engineering BOARD's Rider Systems, Mutsuki uses the  belt in conjunction with the Change Spider Rouse Card to become Leangle. In his default form, Leangle uses the  staff with its built-in 'rouzing' technology allows him to use an Undead's power in his attacks, using a combination of cards to perform a finisher.

Nozomi Yamanaka
 is the 17-year-old girlfriend of Mutsuki. She got indirectly involved with things through him, and though she did not understand what was happening to him regarding the Spider Undead taking over his mind, she worried about and cared for him regardless. Her love was one of the main reasons he was able to resist the Spider's influence. After the influence is cleared and she learned the full truth of the situation, she continued to stand by him.

Jacaranda Cafe

Haruka Kurihara
 is Kotaro's older sister and owner of the Jacaranda Cafe.

Amane Kurihara
 is Haruka's 9-year-old daughter and Kotaro's niece. She is a rude girl who has feelings for Hajime, and is the reason he discovers what it means to be human. In the series ending, she reunites and lives with Hajime happily. An adult Amane returns during the events of Kamen Rider Zi-O as a worker as the Jacaranda Café before being turned into the Another Rider  by the antagonists, turning Kazuma and Hajime human before being defeated by the protagonists with all traces of the Joker essence she absorbed from the two Kamen Riders destroyed.

In the alternate continuity depicted in Missing Ace, a teenaged Amane became a delinquent as Hajime failed to keep his promise of returning. But after being targeted by the Albino Joker to power Jashin 14, she later realized that Hajime was watching over her in spirit and turned over a new leaf.

Undead
The  are the series' antagonists. There are 52 Undead organized into four suits with the Joker, making a common card deck.

The Undead are also divided by Category, with the "Royal" Undead being of a much higher power level than the rest. The Categories Jack, Queen and King Undead are all capable of disguising themselves as humans and are capable of much higher forms of thought than other Undead; forming plans with depth rather than just blindly attacking everything nearby. The Category Ace Undead, whose cards power the Rider Systems, are also very powerful, but lack the form-shifting abilities of the high-class Undead despite being among the greatest warriors of the Undead. Finally, the Joker can assume the form of any sealed Undead it possesses. More Jokers can be created if a human abuses the Rider System. In the movie Missing Ace, an additional Albino Joker is also present.

Diamond Suit
Undead whose sealed cards are used by Kamen Rider Garren.

 The Eight of Diamonds Undead that Garren and Blade encounter at the start of the series during their third mission. Able to control bats, the Bat Undead overwhelmed Garren in a cave before Blade arrives to support him. Once he is blinded by sunlight, the Kamen Riders chased the Bat Undead across the cave to the darkest regions until his wings were clipped by the Garren Rouzer before being sealed by Garren into the Scope Bat card. Voiced by 
 The Nine of Diamonds Undead that can create clones of himself, attacking people at a shopping center until Garren and Blade forced him to retreat. The Undead is later telekinetically forced by Isaka into testing improved Garren, ending up being sealed into the Gemini Zebra card.
 The Four of Diamonds Undead that is sealed into the Rapid Pecker card.
 The Seven of Diamonds Undead who serves as the Serpent Undead's bodyguard to keep Blade and Garren from interfering in her affairs, only to be sealed into the Rock Tortoise card when Garren acquires his Jack form.

Isaka
He deceives Garren into working for him, until he killed Sayako for meddling in his affairs. His power in human form is telekinesis, as well as summoning fireballs and mass hypnosis; which he used to recruit humans to his aid in the creation of Leangle, with the Spider Undead's help in finding an ideal host for him to control. He was sealed by Garren.

Azumi
She's a somewhat psychotic medusa-like monster that is hunting the Joker Undead, with the Tortoise Undead aiding her. Her hair changes to snakes and can be used as whips. She was wounded by Ryo Mikami, Hajime's look alike, and sealed by Chalice, who gives the sealed Absorb Serpent card to Garren so he could assume his own Jack Form.

Kanai
He is the first Undead to learn the truth about the fake Battle Fight and the last Royal Club Undead to be sealed. He kills Tennōji, after using the Riders to fight for him, and steals the Kerberos card so he could gain the power to seal the Black Joker himself; blackmailing Hajime with the event of their fight becoming tied to the death of Amane's father to finish the fight. Despite being shot numerous times with the Garren Rouzer, he resisted being sealed until Garren grabbed him and both plunged off the cliff they battled on.

Club Suit
Undead whose sealed cards are used by Kamen Rider Leangle.

 The Three of Clubs Undead who attacked a subway, eventually attacking a mall which was reduced to rubble in the wake of his destruction. He eventually encounters Leangle, in his first fight without the Spider Undead influence over his mind, and is sealed by Blade into the Screw Mole card.
 Seven of Clubs Undead that can turns himself into a mass of liquid to electrocute people before Leangle uses Chalice's deck to execute his own Spinning Dance to seal the Undead into the Gel Jellyfish card.
 The Nine of Clubs Undead that was sealed in the Smog Squid card, able to use the tentacles on his back to support his body and move rapidly over any terrain. While appearing in Hikaru's memory of first Battle Fight, the Squid Undead is unsealed during the events of Missing Ace.

Spider
Revealed to be partially sealed, the Spider Undead is able to possess Mutsuki and corrupt his mind, using the human to become more powerful throughout the Battle Fight until he no longer needs a human host. Spider is eventually forced out in physical when Mutsuki attempted to assume King form, his will overridden by Noboru Shima. The Spider Undead was properly resealed by Mutsuki with the King Rouser soon after.

Daichi
Though he is pacifistic, he has enormous physical strength, which is also evident while he is human. He is usually found sunbathing near a pool; he wants to lie low until the Battle Fight is complete, thus becoming the winner by taking out the victor. He deems it pointless to fight an enemy unless he knew the limits of the opponent's ability. He was sealed by Blade Jack Form's Lightning Slash.

Noboru Shima
Shima is different from other Undead as he has a good heart and loves humanity, bringing the Rouze Absorber to Blade during his fight with the Elephant Undead. He helps Mutsuki remove the Spider Undead's influence by allowing himself to be sealed by Leangle's Blizzard Crush. It was only when the Tiger Undead sacrificed herself that Shima was able to finally lend his power to Mutsuki to help him defeat the Spider Undead.

Hikaru Jō
 is the human form of the Queen of Clubs Undead, who has a great pride and fights with dignity. While in human form, she possesses uncanny speed and strength. After learning that the Battle Fight is fake, meaning she's fighting without purpose, she infiltrates BOARD, only to encounter Titan, learning of Hiroshi's intent, and attempting to hurt Nozomi out of rage. She asks Sakuya to borrow his Rouze Absorber, later fighting Leangle to have herself intentionally impaled on the Leangle Rouzer and taking the Proper Blank to seal herself. In Mutsuki's subconscious, she encourages him to continue to fight with both light and darkness.

Heart Suit
Undead whose sealed cards are used by Kamen Rider Chalice.

 The Ace of Hearts Undead also known as "Chalice the Legendary", the Mantis Undead is the best fighter of all the Undead. He was sealed by Hajime prior to the series as the Change Mantis card which he uses to become Kamen Rider Chalice.
 The Two of Hearts Undead and winner of the previous Battle Fight, able to communicate with humans via telepathy. After being unsealed, the Human Undead allowed Hajime to seal him into the Spirit Human card to influence the Joker's personality. He is portrayed by Ryoji Morimoto.
 The Seven of Hearts Undead that Kazuma encountered after BOARD disbanded, first appearing at an observatory to strangle people. But due to the fact that Amane was there, Chalice arrives after the monster eludes Blade and goes after the girl. After Chalice leaves with Amane, the Plant Undead telepathically calls Chalice out before ambushing Blade while awaiting for his opponent's arrival. Once Chalice arrives, the Plant Undead is sealed within the Bio Plant card.
 The Eight of Hearts Undead whose flammable powder is lethal to humans, calling out Hajime by burning the photos in his room. He manages to overwhelm Chalice until Blade arrives, with Chalice using the other rider as a distraction to target the Moth at his weak spot before sealing him into the Reflect Moth card.
 The Ten of Hearts Undead that inflicted those near in the Echoing Cave with a fever-induced poison. Among his victims was Amane, who had to be quickly taken to the hospital. Learning of this, Hajime ran to get the antidote with Kazuma following as Garren attempts to seal the Undead. While Blade is forced to hold Garren off, Chalice seals the Undead into the Shuffle Centipede card after slashing off the centipede sticking on the Undead's right shoulder so an antidote can be made.
 The Five of Hearts Undead that attacks Hajime while befriending Jin Ichinose near Hogoka. Though he ran from Chalice in the first fight, the Shell Undead causes a fire on Jin's boat before being sealed into the Drill Shell card.
 The Four of Hearts Undead that can summon dragonflies and fly, calling out Hajime out after abducting Amane and Haruka. But the Undead is forced to retreat when Chalice overpowers him. The next time he attacks, the Dragonfly Undead is sealed by Chalice into the Float Dragonfly, which normally is used for aerial attacks. Chalice also used it as an alternate form when Takahara steals Hajime's Category Ace card for a while, letting Kazuma borrowing it to use its flying ability to take the Change Mantis back.
  The King of Hearts Undead that was sealed prior to the events of the series into the Evolution Card used by Chalice to assume his Wild Card form, an alternate version of the Undead appearing in an alternate dimension depicted in Kamen Rider Decade.

Miyuki Yoshinaga
Kotaro, who has a crush on her, continues to befriend her despite what she has done to him and rescues her from Hajime. This resulted in her becoming unable to cope with human emotion. She was sealed by Chalice into the Absorb Orchid card.

Shinmei

Spade Suit
Undead whose sealed cards are used by Kamen Rider Blade, the entire suit fused into his body whenever he assumes King Form.

 The Ace of Spades Undead that was sealed into the Change Beetle card used by Kazuma.
 The Two of Spades Undead that was sealed in the Slash Lizard card used by Blade. While appearing in Hikaru's memory of first Battle Fight, the Lizard Undead is unsealed during the events of Missing Ace.
 The Five of Spades Undead that is able to jump great heights and break his body into a swarm of locusts, attacking BOARD's headquarters with a majority of its members killed with Blade sealing him into the Kick Locust card.
 The Six of Spade Undead who possesses lightning powers, calling out Garren before he ends up fighting Blade and Garren with the former sealing him into the Thunder Deer card.
 The Seven of Spades Undead that Isaka forced in serving his purpose of attacking the abducted Kazuma in both acquiring data from the human's Fusion Rate as Blade to develop the Leangle System along with data on him, Blade, Chalice, and Garren. The Undead ends up being defeated by Blade and sealed into the Metal Trilobite card.
 The Nine of Spades Undead who uses his superhuman speed to maul his victims, evading Chalice when overpowered and intimidated by the Spider Undead into attacking Sayoko. Blade saves Sayako and manages to seal the Undead into the Mach Jaguar card.
 The Three of Spades Undead that Isaka recruits to kidnap the ideal candidates the Spider Undead identified for the Leangle project. While kidnapping Mutsuki, the Lion Undead confronts Blade and is forced to retreat. When the Lion Undead resumes his attack, he is sealed away by Blade within the Beat Lion card.
 The Four of Spades Undead that was sealed into the Tackle Boar card Kazuma uses, briefly unsealed by Leangle.
 The Eight of Spades Undead that is sealed into the Magnet Buffalo card.
 The Ten of Spade Undead who influences time and serves as King subordinate, Blade managing to seal him into the Time Scarab card after using a piece of cloth that the Scarab Undead had in his hand to keep himself unfrozen in time.

Yazawa
He teams up with Miyuki to get the Blay Buckle from Kazuma, but fails when Chalice interferes with the battle. He possesses a high pitched scream which can obliterate anything, as the Centipede Undead challenged him to a fight. He was sealed by Blade.

Takahara
He made a pact with the Mantis Undead to fight as the two last Undead standing 10,000 years ago. In the present day, he misidentifies Hajime as the Mantis Undead (as he saw Hajime transform into Chalice). He took the Change Mantis card from him with the intention of avenging his comrade. He summons feathers, which he can use as throwing daggers. He was sealed by Blade.

King
He loves to cause trouble and mess with everybody. He also steals Hajime's Rouze Cards to push him back into his Joker form, giving the deck to Mutsuki in order to enjoy the  resulting "mess". He uses telekinesis and can summon his shield by clapping his hands. Though he managed to take his deck from him, Blade managed to beat him and sealed Caucasus with the Blay Rouzer.

Other Undead

Trials
The  series are artificial Undead created by BOARD using technology and human DNA, lacking the immortality the Undead possess yet can absorb Proper Blanks instead of being sealed. The Trials were developed to interfere with the Undead Battle Fight.

  A Trial that was infused with the DNA of Yoshito, who copied his memories into the Trial while programing him to protect Shiori. Though Trial B is reprogrammed by Tennoji to observe the fixed Undead battle while removing potential threats, he remembers his base programming and sacrifices himself to save Shiori from Trial G.
  A Trial deployed to eliminate Kazuma when he is a card away from attaining King Form, only to be destroyed once Kenaki achieve the form.
  A Trial created from Sakuya Tachibana's DNA and imprinted with his combat data as Garren, destroyed by Blade King Form's Royal Straight Flush. Another Trial E appeared in the Hyper Battle Video Blade vs. Blade, disguised as Kazuma wearing a red scarf, it copied the Blay Buckle and transformed into . He fought the real Blade to a standstill with the clueless Sakuya and Mutsuki unable to tell the obvious difference. He was eventually defeated by Blade's Jack Form and King Form with the help of Leangle's Remote Tapir and Garren's Gemini Zebra.
  A Trial created from the DNA of the Paradoxa Undead to capture Kazuma before being destroyed by Wild Chalice's Wild Cyclone.
  A Trial imprinted with Leangle's combat data as Garren, overpowering both Hikaru Jō and the Kamen Riders. It was about to kill Shiori until Trial B intervened remembering the original programming his creator gave him. Destroyed by Wild Chalice's Wild Cyclone and Blade King Form's Royal Straight Flush.

Titan
 is an Undead that Tennoji created by merging the Scorpion and Chameleon Undead into one body with access to the former's poison and the latter's cloaking/disguise abilities with two buckles on its belt. Titan is deployed to turn the Kamen Riders on each other before they trick the Undead into revealing itself and sealed it back into two cards.

Kerberos
 is an Undead that Tennoji made from the DNA of all 53 Undead to surpass the Joker in power, created as the fifth Ace that Tennoji intended to be the victor of the Battle Fight he set up. But Keroberos was beyond Tennoji's control, killing his entire staff upon being born from the Stone of Sealing. The Undead succeeded in absorbing the decks of Chalice and Leangle, along with Jack and Queen cards of Garren. Kerberos even overpowered Blade King Form at first, but was defeated by Royal Straight Flush with Tennoji using the Change Keroberos on herself to become Keroberos II before Kanai takes it. While the card is lost in the series finale, Change Keroberos was recovered and used by Kamen Rider Glaive in the alternate events of Missing Ace, with two copies of the card used in creating Riders Lance and Larc.

Kerberos is voiced by Katsumi Shiono.

Darkroaches
The  are cockroach-like Undead grunts that are extensions of the Stone of Sealing which manifest once Hajime is the sole remaining Undead in the Battle Fight with their only purpose is to wipe out all life on Earth, able to respawn from the monolith after being destroyed. Once Kazuma became the second Joker Undead, the Darkroaches vanished since Battle Fight was put into stalemate. The Darkroaches resurface in 2019 during the events of Kamen Ride Zi-O when Amane becomes the world's only Joker after extracting the Undead essence from Kazuma and Hajime into herself, only to be permanently destroyed once the Joker essence is completely eradicated.

Other characters

Sayoko Fukasawa
 is Sakuya's girlfriend from college. Being a doctor, her office was open to Sakuya whenever he needed to rest. She attempted to help him before she was killed by Isaka/Peacock Undead for her interference in his plan. Because of her death, Sakuya's fear ceased, and she was avenged when he sealed Isaka.

Jin Ichinose
 is a young street musician who befriended Hajime after the latter had left Amane for personal reasons. Jin is a prodigal son of a prominent composer who wants him to become a musician like his older brother. But Jin, being a misanthrope, wants to be independent and away from mankind on the boat he worked hard to get and ready. After seeing Hajime turn into Chalice, Jin eventually severed his ties with Hajime after his battle with the Shell Undead resulted with Jin's boat being burned down, killing the young man's dream.

Go Kiryu
 is a former member of BOARD which was supposed to be the first user of Garren, but was incompatible. Kiryu had a warped sense of justice, using his prosthetic hand to electrocute petty crooks. Eventually, upon the discovery of Leangle, he briefly used the Leangle Buckle, recognized by the Spider Undead as a more suitable vessel out of like-mindedness. But once defeated, Spider Undead abandoned Kiryu for Mutsuki as the Locust, Deer and Jaguar Undeads mauled Kiryu on command.

Rei Kaimioka
 is a photographer who is a close friend of the Kurihara Family who employs Hajime as an apprentice. When she examined the picture of the place where Amane's father had died, she found out that Hajime is in the picture. She at first thought that Hajime killed Mr. Kurihara but later realized his innocence. She also saw Hajime transform into Chalice, who saved her when she was under attack by the Eagle Undead.

Tatsuya Yamaguchi
 is a motorcycle racer who aids the Riders to stop the Wolf Undead, but attempting to block off the creature so the Riders could catch up with it.

Tatsuya Yamaguchi portrays himself.

Ryo Mikami
 is an exact look-alike of Hajime, who makes takoyaki as a member of the Iroha clan, having a forbidden romance with Michi. Fed up with his life, he swapped identities with an amnesiac Hajime.

Ryoji Morimoto, who already portrays Hajime Aikawa, also portrays Ryo Mikami.

Michi
 is Ryo's girlfriend. Although she is a daughter of the Iroha's taiyaki-making rival clan, the Hoheto clan, she also makes takoyaki and supports Ryo. When Ryo and Hajime changed their identities for a while, she discovers that her boyfriend (actually an amnesiac Hajime) has hidden abilities, and eventually fell in love with him for a second time. Through Hajime, she made the two rival clans reconcile with each other. In the end, she and Ryo were married after they discovered that Ryo and Hajime were two different people.

Umi Ikuhara
 is a young girl whose parents and brother died in an earthquake, she saw Kazuma transform into Blade. She made a lot of trouble to Kazuma, because she wants Kazuma to be her "superhero." Through Kazuma, she learned the true meaning of protecting people, since she believes that no one will protect her.

Spin-off exclusive characters

Junichi Shimura
 is the main antagonist of Kamen Rider Blade: Missing Ace. Like Hajime Aikawa, he is a Joker Undead. When the previous fight ended with Kenzaki sealing Hajime, he rose out of the shadows. The first step in his plan was to release all of the Undeads again. He did this after attacking Karasuma who had the rouze cards in his possession. Time passes, and he eventually joins BOARD, which is now operated by Sakuya Tachibana. He then recruits two subordinates to help him, Shin Magaki and Miwa Natsumi after saving them from Peacock Undead. When all the Undeads are sealed, he kills his own subordinates and disguises himself as Shin to fool the other riders, but Shiori figures out Shimura's plan and he is exposed. His plan is to obtain the power of Jashin 14 using the Vanity Card, his main target is Amane Kurihara because it's revealed that her father entered the location of Jashin 14, so only one of his blood can be sacrificed. During the fight with the Albino Roaches, Kenzaki tells Mutsuki to unseal Hajime, which he does. With Hajime released, he goes out and protects Amane and takes her to safety. Shimura catches up with them and Hajime turns into Black Joker to fight Shimura; unfortunately, still exhausted after being unsealed, Shimura defeats him. In some magazines, there are shots of the Albino Joker wielding a red scythe at the location of this scene; however, this weapon was never seen in the movie. He then uses the Evolution King cards to create the Vanity Card and seals Amane in it. He then goes on to revive Jashin 14 by inserting it into an ancient tablet fusing with the rouze beast to obtain its power. He then appears to the riders in his new form and attempts to kill them. Hajime has a plan to free Amane and stop Shimura. He trades places with Amane and tells Kenzaki to destroy the tablet. Kenzaki hesitates knowing he'll kill Hajime, but Hajime convinces him and destroys it. This results in Shimura being weakened. Kenzaki then changes into King Form and uses his Royal Straight Flush attack to split Jashin, thus Shimura dies in the explosion that ensured from the monster's death. His name, "glaive", refers to the French word glaive as his arsenal is based on Blade's.

Natsumi Miwa
 is one of the characters appeared exclusively in Kamen Rider Blade: Missing Ace. Originally, Natsumi applied as an office worker, but was berated by the boss. As a result, she knocked him out after having enough of his words. She is armed with the  crossbow, based on the Garren Rouzer and Chalice Arrow, which allows her to perform the  finisher. She was killed by the Albino Joker shortly after all the Category King Undeads had been resealed. Her rider name, "Larc", may come from the French words "l'arc" which means "the bow", being the replacement of Chalice, as well as Garren, for the team's long range fighter.

Shin Magaki
 is one of the characters appeared exclusively in Kamen Rider Blade: Missing Ace. He was originally working as a waiter until he was fired after knocking out a rude customer. He is armed with the  spear, based on the Leangle Rouser, which allows him to perform the  finisher. The attack is activated when the Rouse card, Mighty Impact is roused. He is attacked by the Albino Joker and is mortally wounded, his last act before dying was giving Shiori two cards, a Jack and Four (Ja and Shi), which gave her clues to identifying Junichi Shimura/Kamen Rider Glaive as his assailant.

Shin Magaki .

References

Characters
Blade
Kamen Rider Blade